Fox Life is an international pay television network, launched by the Fox Networks Group in 2004. The network has been discontinued in several markets over time, and is currently active in the Middle East, Bulgaria, Portugal, the Balkans and India.

The network's scheduling has varied with each version, ranging from traditional entertainment programming, including television series, sitcoms and movies, among others, original programming in certain regions, and instructional and aspirational reality television on some other variations; in North America for instance, the network carried mainly Spanish language dubbed versions of American reality shows and instructional programming. The channel has been owned by International Operations division of The Walt Disney Company since March 2019.

History
Fox Life first launched in Italy on May 13, 2004, Portugal on May 19, 2005, and in Bulgaria on September 8, 2005. For Latin America, it started in July 2006, when it was launched in Brazil. The channel also has versions in other countries around Europe. It launched in the Netherlands and Flanders on September 7, 2008. Fox Life launched in the United States on November 4, 2013.

Flemish version
As of 22 November 2011 Fox had to change the programming for Fox Life in Flanders due to television rights issues in Belgium. From then on a separate Flemish version was airing in Belgium. It used to air the Dutch version. The provider of satellite television in the Netherlands, Canal Digitaal, had to replace Fox Life by the Finnish version as well because it shared the Fox Life feed with the Belgium provider of satellite television, TV Vlaanderen Digitaal.

Launch in Southeast Asia

On October 1, 2017, Hong Kong and Southeast Asian version of Star World was rebranded to Fox Life.

Rebranding/closing in Europe
From 22 September 2015 Fox Life has been replaced by 24Kitchen for satellite viewers in the Netherlands. The Finnish Fox Life was rebranded as Fox.

Fox Networks Group Benelux announced that Fox Life would officially close in the Netherlands on December 31, 2016.

Rebranding/closing in Latin America
On 27 November 2020 Fox announced that they would be renaming the Fox branded channels in Latin America to Star Life on 22 February 2021. The networks closed on 31 March 2022 along with the American version.

Closing in Southeast Asia
From 1 September 2021, FOX Life along with most of The Walt Disney Company channels (Fox Crime, Fox, FX, Disney Junior, Disney Channel, Nat Geo People, Fox Movies, Fox Action Movies, Fox Family Movies, Star Movies China, SCM Legend, and five of its sports channels) officially ceased broadcasting and transmission on Now TV Hong Kong.

After 11 years of broadcasting, FOX Life along with most of The Walt Disney Company channels across Southeast Asia and Hong Kong (Fox Crime, Fox, FX, Disney Junior, Disney Channel, Nat Geo People, Fox Movies, Fox Action Movies, Fox Family Movies, Star Movies China, SCM Legend, and five of its sports channels) officially ceased all operations, transmission and broadcasting on 1 October 2021 with the very final and last two (2) programs aired is The Good Doctor (Malaysia and Brunei Only) and The Unicorn (Rest of Southeast Asia and Hong Kong). Before very final and last showing a farewell video of Thank You From Fox Life, promo of In the Dark Season 3, and the message "This channel is no longer available, thank you for watching." after both programs. All these channels shows officially moved to Disney+ (in Singapore, Philippines, Hong Kong and Taiwan) and Disney+ Hotstar (in Southeast Asia outside Singapore and Philippines), and the channel space initially created by the original incarnation of Star Plus in 1991 subsequently folded and ceased to exist.

Closing in the United States
Notice of the discontinuation of the American iteration of Fox Life was sent to cable providers by Disney Media and Entertainment Distribution in late December 2021; the channel would be discontinued on March 31, 2022.

See also
Fox Life Greece
Fox Life Italy
Fox Life India

References

External links 
 Fox Life official Italian website
 Fox Life official Korean website

 
Television channels and stations established in 2004
Television channels and stations disestablished in 2022
Television channels in North Macedonia
Disney television networks
Women's interest channels
Fox Networks Group
Defunct television channels in the Netherlands
Defunct television channels in Belgium
2016 disestablishments in the Netherlands